George E. Kryder was a Republican politician from Henry County, Ohio. He was President of the Ohio Senate in 1923 and 1924.

George E. Kryder was born February 10, 1872, near McClure, Henry County, Ohio. He was the son of George Kryder and Elizabeth Sweetman Kryder. He attended the common schools and Ohio Normal University.

Kryder taught school for six years, and then became a farmer and breeder of registered Jersey cattle. He was elected as a Republican to the Ohio's 33rd senatorial district, (Fulton, Hancock, Henry, Putnam and Wood Counties), for the 83rd Ohio General Assembly, (1919-1920). He was re-elected to the 84th, (1921-1922), and 85th General Assemblies, (1923-1924), and was President Pro-Tem of the 85th.

Kryder was married with five children. He was a member of the Knights of Pythias and Modern Woodmen of America. He died November 13, 1953, in Ohio. He was buried at Olive Branch Cemetery in McClure, Ohio.

Notes

References

Presidents of the Ohio State Senate
Republican Party Ohio state senators
1872 births
1953 deaths
Ohio Northern University alumni
People from Henry County, Ohio